Ragsdale is a surname. Notable people with the surname include:

Blake Ragsdale Van Leer (1893–1956), president of Georgia Institute of Technology
Corey Ragsdale (born 1982), American baseball coach
Daniel Ragsdale, until 2017 - Deputy Director of the Immigration & Customs Enforcement (ICE)
Danny Ragsdale (born 1977), American football player
David Ragsdale, American rock violinist
George Ragsdale (born 1951), American football player
Graham Ragsdale, of the Canadian Forces was the commander of the Third Battalion Princess Patricia's Canadian Light Infantry
Isaac Newton Ragsdale (1859–1937), mayor of Atlanta, Georgia
J. Willard Ragsdale (1872–1919), American politician
Juli Ragsdale (born 1958), American publisher, film producer, composer
Katherine Hancock Ragsdale, American episcopal priest
Richard Ragsdale (died 2004), American physician
Ronald Sargison AKC, Dean of St George's Cathedral, Georgetown, Guyana
Virginia Ragsdale (1870–1945) American teacher and mathematician
William Ragsdale (born 1961), American actor
William P. Ragsdale (1837–1877), American lawyer and translator
William Ragsdale Cannon (1916–1997), American United Methodist bishop

See also
 Ragsdale (disambiguation)